Wendy Wood is a UK-born psychologist who is the Provost Professor of Psychology and Business at University of Southern California, where she has been a faculty member since 2009.  She previously served as vice dean of social sciences at the Dornsife College of the University of Southern California. Her primary research contributions are in habits and behavior change along with the psychology of gender.

She is the author of the popular science book, Good Habits, Bad Habits, released in October 2019. This book was featured in the Next Big Idea Club and was reviewed in the New Yorker.

Background 

Wood completed her bachelor's degree at University of Illinois at Urbana–Champaign and her Ph.D. at the University of Massachusetts, Amherst.

Prior to her current position, Wood was on the faculty at University of Wisconsin–Milwaukee, Texas A&M University as the Ella C. McFadden Professor of Liberal Arts, and Duke University, where she was the James B. Duke Professor of Psychology and Neuroscience.

Wood is a fellow of the Society for Personality and Social Psychology, American Psychological Society, and Society for Experimental Social Psychology, and a founding member of the Society for Research Synthesis Methodology. She has also served as associate editor of  Psychological Review, American Psychologist, Personality and Social Psychology Review, Journal of Personality and Social Psychology, and Personality and Social Psychology Bulletin. She served as President of the 8,000 member Society for Personality and Social Psychology. Her research has been recognized with awards including a 2007 Radcliffe Institute Fellowship, the 2021 Distinguished Contribution Award from Attitudes and Social influence, as well as the 2022 Career Contribution Award from SPSP. Her scientific research has been cited more than 42,000 times.

Habits 
Wood's primary research focuses on the nature of habits and their influence on behavior. Habits are cognitive associations that people learn through repeated experience. Each time a behavior is repeated in the same context (location, time of day) for a reward (meeting a goal, feeling good), connections form in memory between the context and the rewarded response. After enough repetition, the habitual response is automatically activated in mind when people are in that context.<ref>Wood, W., & Runger, D. T (2016). The psychology of habit. Annual Review, 67', 289-314.</ref> Habits are thus mental shortcuts that reduce decision making and make it easy to repeat what we have done in the past. As Wood has shown, and other research has replicated many times, habits can be initiated independently of intentions and can occur with minimal conscious control. Wood's research has focused on how and why people fall back into old habits, how good habits help people meet their goals, how to change unwanted habits, habits of social media use, and how interaction habits lead to discrimination in social groups. Many of the actions of everyday life are habitual and thus can be difficult to change. A signature finding is that 43% of people's everyday actions are performed in a habitual way.

People are most likely to form habits when contexts promote easy repetition and when the behavior itself is rewarding. Ease of repetition reflects friction, or few barriers to performing the behavior. Friction is low when behaviors require little time, travel distance, or effort. Illustrating how even subtle friction influences behavior, people were less likely to take an elevator and more likely to use the stairs when researchers slowed the elevator door closing by 16 seconds. Rewards for a behavior can be intrinsic or extrinsic, but importantly should be experienced during performance. Thus, listening to podcasts while exercising is a reward that helps to build an exercise habit. Rewards activate the release of dopamine in the brain, which help to forge habit memory traces.

Habit performance thus depends on context cues. When people experience changes in everyday contexts, such as when they move house or start a new job, then their old behaviors are no longer automatically cued. Context changes thus disrupt automatic repetition and force people to make decisions. Unless they have strong intentions to continue the behavior, they are unlikely to do so. This work and its implications for addictions have been featured on NPR.Creatures Of Habit: How Habits Shape Who We Are — And Who We Become https://www.npr.org/2019/12/11/787160734/creatures-of-habit-how-habits-shape-who-we-are-and-who-we-become

 Research 
Wood has made influential contributions in two additional research areas: the origins and maintenance of sex-related differences and similarities in social behavior and the dynamics of social influence and attitude change.

In the study of sex and gender, Wood has emphasized that the behavior of women and men can be different or similar, depending on individual dispositions, situations, cultures, and historical periods. This flexibility reflects the central importance of a division of labor between women and men that is not static but is tailored to local ecological and socioeconomic conditions. Each society's division of labor is constrained by women's childbearing and nursing of infants and men's greater size and strength. Because these biological characteristics influence the how efficiently men or women can perform many activities, they create some uniformity across societies in the division of labor as well as variability across situations, cultures, and history.

Within societies, people regulate their own behavior according to their desired gender identities. Wood's research has illuminated the self-regulatory processes by which gender identities affect the behaviors of women and men. Also, Wood has argued that hormonal, reward, and cardiovascular mechanisms work in conjunction with these social psychological processes to facilitate masculine and feminine behaviors.

Wood has also undertaken research on several aspects of attitudes and social influence. Her work on minority influence has clarified the conditions under which people are influenced by the opinions of those who are in the minority in groups, compared with those who are in the majority. She has also examined the influence processes that occur in close relationships.  Her attention to attitude change processes includes the effects of forewarnings of impending influence on the extent to which persuasion is effective.

Wood's work has typically combined primary research and meta-analytic integrations of all of the available evidence. She has thus produced numerous highly authoritative meta-analyses of social psychological phenomena.Rhodes, N., & Wood, W. (1992). Self-esteem and intelligence affect influence ability: The mediating role of message reception. Psychological Bulletin, 111(1), 156-171. A 2014  meta-analysis testing the influence of menstrual cycles on women's mate preferences debunked the then-popular idea that women, when fertile, prefer more masculine, high testosterone men. Considerable research has echoed this failure for menstrual phase to affect mate preferences.

 Works 

 Good Habits, Bad Habits'' (2019).

References

External links 
official website at  College of Letters Arts and Sciences, USC
Official faculty website at USC

Living people
American social psychologists
University of Southern California faculty
University of Illinois Urbana-Champaign alumni
University of Massachusetts Amherst alumni
American women psychologists
Fellows of the American Psychological Association
Fellows of the Society of Experimental Psychologists
Texas A&M University faculty
Duke University faculty
University of Wisconsin–Milwaukee faculty
20th-century American psychologists
21st-century American psychologists
21st-century American women scientists
20th-century American women scientists
American women academics
Year of birth missing (living people)